Kasepalli is a village in the Peddavadugur mandal in Anantapur District of Andhra Pradesh, India.

Location

Demographics
The language of Kasepalli is Telugu.

Gallery

Villages in Anantapur district